The family Lasiocampidae comprises the eggar moths, of which 10 are resident species in Great Britain, one probably extinct and one probably an immigrant:

 Poecilocampa populi, December moth — throughout
 Trichiura crataegi, pale eggar — throughout (vulnerable) ‡*
 Eriogaster lanestris, small eggar — south, central (Nationally Scarce B)

 Malacosoma neustria, lackey — south, central (common) and north (scattered) (Vulnerable) ‡*
 Malacosoma castrensis, ground lackey — south-east, south-west (Nationally Scarce A)
 Lasiocampa trifolii, grass eggar — south, west-central (Nationally Scarce A)
 Lasiocampa trifolii f. flava (pale grass eggar) — south-east (Red Data Book)
 Lasiocampa quercus, oak eggar
 Lasiocampa quercus quercus — south, central
 Lasiocampa quercus f. callunae (northern eggar) — north, west
 Macrothylacia rubi, fox moth — throughout
 Dendrolimus pini, pine-tree lappet — rare immigrant
 Euthrix potatoria, drinker — south, central, north-west
 Phyllodesma ilicifolia, small lappet — presumed extinct

 Gastropacha quercifolia, lappet — south, east-central

Species listed in the 2007 UK Biodiversity Action Plan (BAP) are indicated by a double-dagger symbol (‡)—species so listed for research purposes only are also indicated with an asterisk (‡*).

See also
List of moths of Great Britain (overview)
Family lists: Hepialidae, Cossidae, Zygaenidae, Limacodidae, Sesiidae, Lasiocampidae, Saturniidae, Endromidae, Drepanidae, Thyatiridae, Geometridae, Sphingidae, Notodontidae, Thaumetopoeidae, Lymantriidae, Arctiidae, Ctenuchidae, Nolidae, Noctuidae and Micromoths

References 

 Waring, Paul, Martin Townsend and Richard Lewington (2003) Field Guide to the Moths of Great Britain and Ireland. British Wildlife Publishing, Hook, UK. .

Moths
Britain
Moths